Panagiotis Tsiros (Greek: Παναγιώτης Τσίρος; born on February 19, 1983, in Athens, Greece) is a Greek professional basketball player. He is a 5'11" (1.80 m) tall  point guard.

Professional career
Tsiros played amateur basket for Lavrio before starting his pro career with the club. During his first spell with the club, he had two loan spells to Markopoulo.

In 2010, he signed with Markopoulo as a Free agent.

In 2011 Tsiros returned to Lavrio. He is among with Michalis Perrakis and Dionysis Giannakopoulos one of the pillars of the club.

References

External links
Eurobasket.com Profile 
Greek League Profile
DraftExpress.com Profile
Basketball-Reference.com Profile
RealGM.com Profile

1983 births
Living people
Greek men's basketball players
Greek Basket League players
Lavrio B.C. players
Point guards
Basketball players from Athens